Izadkhvast-e Gharbi Rural District is a rural district (dehestan) in Izadkhvast District, Zarrin Dasht County, Fars Province, Iran. At the 2006 census, its population was 2,946, in 682 families. It has 4 villages.

References 

Rural Districts of Fars Province
Zarrin Dasht County